Bhavaraju Sarveswara Rao was an Indian economist and a social scientist.

He was born in Peddapuram in the East Godavari district of Andhra Pradesh in India in 1915 to parents Parabrahma Murthy and Lakshmi. His early schooling was in Peddapuram and Rajahmundry. For his higher education he moved to Visakhapatnam to study at the Andhra University. He died 29 Feb 2022.

Education

Work

Retirement

References

20th-century Indian economists
Andhra University alumni
1915 births
2010 deaths